Girish Chandra Murmu (born 21 November 1959) is the 14th Comptroller and Auditor General of India and the external auditor of the Inter-Parliamentary Union. He is also the chairman of the United Nations Panel of External Auditors and the Asian Organization of Supreme Audit Institutions. He is currently the external auditor of the WHO (2020-2023), succeeding the Auditor General of the Philippines. He was the Inaugural Lieutenant Governor of the Union Territory of Jammu and Kashmir till 6 August 2020. He is a 1985 batch IAS officer of Gujarat cadre and was principal secretary to Narendra Modi during his tenure as the Chief Minister of Gujarat.

Early life and education
G.C. Murmu was born on 21 November 1959 in Betnoti village of Mayurbhanj district in Odisha in a Santal family. He holds a Master of Arts degree in Political Science from Utkal University. He also holds an MBA degree from University of Birmingham. He is the eldest among eight siblings, six brothers and two sisters. One of his brothers, Shirish Chandra Murmu is working as an Executive Director at the Reserve Bank of India as of 2022.

Career
In 2001, when Narendra Modi became chief minister of Gujarat, Murmu was the Relief Commissioner. Shortly afterwards he became Commissioner, Mines and Minerals and thereafter Managing Director, Gujarat Maritime Board.

Murmu's career took off in 2004 when he was made joint secretary of the Gujarat Home Department, which was headed by Amit Shah and directly supervised by Narendra Modi.
He was given the task of handling the 2002 Gujarat riots cases. when Amit Shah was in jail, Murmu prepared his case papers.

On 31 October 2019, Murmu took charge as the 1st Lieutenant Governor of Jammu and Kashmir after the formation of the new Union territory of Jammu and Kashmir under the Jammu and Kashmir Reorganisation Act, 2019. He succeeded Governor of Jammu and Kashmir Satya Pal Malik, to become the 1st Lieutenant Governor of Jammu and Kashmir. Chief Justice of Jammu and Kashmir High Court Gita Mittal administered the oath of office at a function at Raj Bhavan. On 5 August 2020, he resigned from his position. 

On 8 August 2020, he was appointed as the Comptroller and Auditor General of India.

See also
 R. K. Mathur

References

|-

1959 births
Living people
Utkal University alumni
Alumni of the University of Birmingham
Indian Administrative Service officers
People from Mayurbhanj district
Santali people
Lieutenant Governors of Jammu and Kashmir